Mikhail Genrikhovich Gorlin (1909–1943) was a Russian emigre poet who founded the Berlin Poets' Club in 1928. He and his wife (the poet Raisa Blokh) later perished during World War II in a German concentration camp.

Publications
1936. Puteshestviia. Berlin: Petropolis. (Poems)

References

Brian Boyd Vladimir Nabokov: The Russian Years. Princeton University Press, 1990.

External links
Memoirs about Gorlin and Blokh

Literary archives
Some of Gorlin's writings and correspondence are held in the Vladimir Korvin-Piotrovskii Papers at the Beinecke Library, Yale University. 

Russian male poets
1909 births
1943 deaths
20th-century Russian poets
20th-century Russian male writers
Soviet emigrants to Germany
Russian Jews who died in the Holocaust
Soviet people who died in Nazi concentration camps